Sons of Anarchy, a television drama series created by Kurt Sutter, premiered on September 3, 2008 on the cable network FX in the United States. The series concluded on December 9, 2014, after 92 episodes broadcast over seven seasons.

Sons of Anarchy tells the story of an outlaw motorcycle club based in the fictional small town of Charming, California. The show follows protagonist Jackson "Jax" Teller (Charlie Hunnam), son of the deceased founding president John Teller, who begins questioning the club and the direction in which they should be heading.

Series overview

Episodes

Season 1 (2008)

Season 2 (2009)

Season 3 (2010)

Season 4 (2011)

Season 5 (2012)

Season 6 (2013)

Season 7 (2014)

Ratings 
<noinclude>

References

External links 
 
 

Lists of American drama television series episodes